The shoebill (Balaeniceps rex) also known as the whalebill, whale-headed stork or shoe-billed stork, is a very large long-legged wading bird. It derives its name from its enormous shoe-shaped bill. It has a somewhat stork-like overall form and has previously been classified with the storks in the order Ciconiiformes based on this morphology. However, genetic evidence places it with pelicans and herons in the Pelecaniformes. The adult is mainly grey while the juveniles are more brown. It lives in tropical East Africa in large swamps from South Sudan to Zambia.

Taxonomy

The shoebill may have been known to Ancient Egyptians but was not classified until the 19th century, after skins and eventually live specimens were brought to Europe. John Gould very briefly described it in 1850 from the skin of a specimen collected on the upper White Nile by the English traveller Mansfield Parkyns. Gould provided a more detailed description in the following year. He placed the species in its own genus Balaeniceps and coined the binomial name Balaeniceps rex. The genus name comes from the Latin words balaena "whale", and caput "head", abbreviated to -ceps in compound words. Alternative common names are whalebill, shoe-billed stork and whale-headed stork.

Traditionally considered as allied with the storks (Ciconiiformes), it was retained there in the Sibley-Ahlquist taxonomy which lumped a massive number of unrelated taxa into their "Ciconiiformes". Based on osteological evidence, the suggestion of a pelecaniform affinity was made in 1957 by Patricia Cottam. Microscopic analysis of eggshell structure by Konstantin Mikhailov in 1995 found that the eggshells of shoebills closely resembled those of other Pelecaniformes in having a covering of thick microglobular material over the crystalline shells. In 2003, the shoebill was again suggested as closer to the pelicans (based on anatomical comparisons) or the herons (based on biochemical evidence). A 2008 DNA study reinforces their membership of the Pelecaniformes.

So far, two fossilized relatives of the shoebill have been described: Goliathia from the early Oligocene of Egypt and Paludavis from the Early Miocene of the same country. It has been suggested that the enigmatic African fossil bird Eremopezus was a relative too, but the evidence for that is unconfirmed. All that is known of Eremopezus is that it was a very large, probably flightless bird with a flexible foot, allowing it to handle either vegetation or prey.

Description

The signature feature of the species is its huge, bulbous bill, which is straw-coloured with erratic greyish markings. As in the pelicans, the upper mandible is strongly keeled, ending in a sharp nail. The shoebill's feet are exceptionally large, with the middle toe reaching  in length, likely assisting the species in its ability to stand on aquatic vegetation while hunting. The neck is relatively shorter and thicker than other long-legged wading birds such as herons and cranes.

The plumage of adult birds is blue-grey with darker slaty-grey flight feathers. The breast presents some elongated feathers, which have dark shafts. The juvenile has a similar plumage colour, but is a darker grey with a brown tinge. When they are first born, shoebills have a more modestly-sized bill, which is initially silvery-grey. The bill becomes more noticeably large when the chicks are 23 days old and becomes well developed by 43 days.

Voice
The shoebill is normally silent, but they perform bill-clattering displays at the nest. When engaging in these displays, adult birds have also been noted to utter a cow-like moo as well as high-pitched whines. Both nestlings and adults engage in bill-clattering during the nesting season as a means of communication. When young are begging for food, they call out with a sound uncannily like human hiccups. In one case, a flying adult bird was heard uttering hoarse croaks, apparently as a sign of aggression at a nearby marabou stork (Leptoptilos crumeniferus).

Flight pattern
Its wings are held flat while soaring and, as in the pelicans and the storks of the genus Leptoptilos, the shoebill flies with its neck retracted. Its flapping rate, at an estimated 150 flaps per minute, is one of the slowest of any bird, with the exception of the larger stork species. The pattern is alternating flapping and gliding cycles of approximately seven seconds each, putting its gliding distance somewhere between the larger storks and the Andean condor (Vultur gryphus). Long flights of the shoebill are rare, and only a few flights beyond its minimum foraging distance of  have been recorded.

Distribution and habitat
The shoebill is distributed in freshwater swamps of central tropical Africa, from southern Sudan and South Sudan through parts of eastern Congo, Rwanda, Uganda, western Tanzania and northern Zambia. The species is most numerous in the West Nile sub-region and South Sudan (especially the Sudd, a main stronghold for the species); it is also significant in wetlands of Uganda and western Tanzania. More isolated records have been reported of shoebills in Kenya, the Central African Republic, northern Cameroon, south-western Ethiopia, Malawi. Vagrant strays to the Okavango Basin, Botswana and the upper Congo River have also been sighted. The distribution of this species seems to largely coincide with that of papyrus and lungfish. They are often found in areas of flood plain interspersed with undisturbed papyrus and reedbeds. When shoebill storks are in an area with deep water, a bed of floating vegetation is a requirement. They are also found where there is poorly oxygenated water. This causes the fish living in the water to surface for air more often, increasing the likelihood a shoebill stork will successfully capture it. The shoebill is non-migratory with limited seasonal movements due to habitat changes, food availability and disturbance by humans.

Petroglyphs from Oued Djerat, eastern Algeria, show that the shoebill occurred during the Early Holocene much more to the north, in the wetlands that covered the present-day Sahara Desert at that time.

The shoebill occurs in extensive, dense freshwater marshes. Almost all wetlands that attract the species have undisturbed Cyperus papyrus and reed beds of Phragmites and Typha. Although their distribution largely seems to correspond with the distribution of papyrus in central Africa, the species seems to avoid pure papyrus swamps and is often attracted to areas with mixed vegetation. More rarely, the species has been seen foraging in rice fields and flooded plantations.

Behaviour and ecology
The shoebill is noted for its slow movements and tendency to stay still for long periods, resulting in descriptions of the species as "statue-like". They are quite sensitive to human disturbance and may abandon their nests if flushed by humans. However, while foraging, if dense vegetation stands between it and humans, this wader can be fairly tame. The shoebill is attracted to poorly oxygenated waters such as swamps, marshes and bogs  where fish frequently surface to breathe. They also seem to exhibit migratory behaviors based upon differences in the surface water level. Immature shoebills abandon nesting sites which increased in the surface water level whereas adult shoebills abandon nesting sites which decreased in surface water level. It is suggested that both adult and immature shoebills prefer nesting sites with similar surface water levels. Exceptionally for a bird this large, the shoebill often stands and perches on floating vegetation, making them appear somewhat like a giant jacana, although the similarly sized and occasionally sympatric Goliath heron (Ardea goliath) is also known to stand on aquatic vegetation. This species stalks its prey patiently, in a slow and lurking fashion. While hunting, the shoebill strides very slowly and is frequently motionless. Unlike some other large waders, this species hunts entirely using vision and is not known to engage in tactile hunting. When prey is spotted, it launches a quick violent strike. However, depending on the size of the prey, handling time after the strike can exceed 10 minutes. Around 60% of strikes yield prey. Frequently water and vegetation is snatched up during the strike and is spilled out from the edges of the mandibles. The activity of hippopotamus may inadvertently benefit the shoebill, as submerged hippos occasionally force fish to the surface.

Breeding

The solitary nature of shoebills extends to their breeding habits. Nests typically occur at less than three nests per square kilometre, unlike herons, cormorants, pelicans and storks which predominantly nest in colonies. In the extreme north and south of the species' range, nesting starts right after the rains end. In more central regions of the range, it may nest near the end of the wet season in order for the eggs to hatch around the beginning of the following wet season. Both the nest and platform are made of aquatic vegetation. From one to three white eggs are laid. Incubation lasts for approximately 30 days. Both parents actively brood, shade, guard and feed the nestling, though the females are perhaps slightly more attentive. Shoebills use their mandibles to cool their eggs with water during days with high temperatures around 30-33°C. They fill their mandible once, swallow the water, and fill another mandible full of water before proceeding back to their nest where they pour out the water and regurgitate the previously swallowed water onto both the nest and eggs. Food items are regurgitated whole from the gullet straight into the bill of the young. Shoebills rarely raise more than one chick but will hatch more. The younger chicks usually die and are intended as "back-ups" in case the eldest chick dies or is weak. Fledging is reached at around 105 days and the young birds can fly well by 112 days. However, they are still fed for possibly a month or more after this. It will take the young shoebills three years before they become fully sexually mature.

Shoebills are elusive when nesting, so cameras must be placed to observe them from afar to collect behavioral data. There is an advantage for birds that are early breeders, as the chicks are tended for a longer period.

Diet
Shoebills are largely piscivorous but are assured predators of a considerable range of wetland vertebrates. Preferred prey species have reportedly included marbled lungfish (Protopterus aethiopicus), African lungfish (Protopterus annectens), and Senegal bichir (Polypterus senegalus) and various Tilapia species and catfish, the latter mainly in the genus Clarias. Other prey eaten by this species has included frogs, water snakes, Nile monitors (Varanus niloticus) and baby crocodiles. More rarely, small turtles, snails, rodents, small waterfowl and carrion have reportedly been eaten. 

Given its sharp-edged beak, huge bill, and wide gape, the shoebill can hunt large prey, often targeting prey bigger than is taken by other large wading birds. The main prey items fed to young by the parents were the catfish Clarias gariepinus,(syn. In Uganda, lungfish and catfish were mainly fed to the young. Larger lungfish and catfish were taken in Malagarasi wetlands in western Tanzania. The entire process from scooping to swallowing ranged from 2 to 30 minutes depending on prey size. However, these large prey are relatively hard to handle and often targeted by African fish eagle (Haliaeetus vocifer), which frequently steal large wading bird's prey.

Relationship to humans
This species is considered to be one of the five most desirable birds in Africa by birdwatchers. They are docile with humans and show no threatening behavior. Researchers were able to observe a bird on its nest at a close distance – within . Shoebills are often kept in zoos, but breeding is rarely reported. Shoebills have bred successfully at Pairi Daiza in Belgium and at Tampa's Lowry Park Zoo in Florida.

Status and conservation
There is also a viable population in the Malagarasi wetlands in Tanzania. BirdLife International has classified it as Vulnerable with the main threats being habitat destruction, disturbance and hunting. The bird is listed under Appendix II of the Convention on International Trade in Endangered Species of Wild Fauna and Flora (CITES). Habitat destruction and degradation, hunting, disturbance and illegal capture are all contributing factors to the decline of this species. Agriculture cultivation and pasture for cattle have also caused significant habitat loss. Indigenous communities that surround Shoebill habitats capture their eggs and chicks for human consumption and for trade. Frequent fires in southern Sudan and deliberate fires for grazing access contribute to habitat loss. Lastly, swamps in Sudan are being drained for construction of a nearby canal that allows for artificial control of nearby waterways.

References

Further reading

External links

Articles containing video clips
Birds of Sub-Saharan Africa
Fauna of East Africa
Pelecaniformes
Birds described in 1850
Taxa named by John Gould